The Property Council of Australia is an Australian national lobby group representing property developers and property owners. It was formed as the Building Owners and Managers’ Association of Australia (BOMA)  1966, incorporated in 1969, and assumed its current name in 1996.

The PCA engages in lobbying on a large scale, with its budgets in 2015 reported as including $6.4 million for advocacy, $1 million for communications, and $7.2 million for networking. It engaged in a major television campaign, "Don't Play With Property", ahead of the 2016 federal election seeking to preserve negative gearing. It has been a significant donor to both major political parties.

It has campaigned on a broad range of property-related issues, including opposing land tax increases, reducing stamp duty, opposing minimum apartment standards, reforming strata title, opposing increased fees for foreign property purchasers and opposing land-clearing restrictions.

Prime Minister Scott Morrison was the organisation's national policy and research manager from 1989 to 1995.

References

Organizations established in 1966
1966 establishments in Australia